Markus Kullig (born 4 November 1974) is a retired German football player. He spent two seasons in the Bundesliga with VfL Wolfsburg and 1. FC Kaiserslautern.

References

External links
 

1974 births
Living people
German footballers
VfL Wolfsburg players
VfL Wolfsburg II players
VfB Lübeck players
1. FC Kaiserslautern players
Bundesliga players
2. Bundesliga players
Sportspeople from Bielefeld
Association football midfielders
Footballers from North Rhine-Westphalia